Ab Wolders (born 10 June 1951) is a former strongman and world champion Powerlifter from the Netherlands.  He was runner-up at the World's Strongest Man competition on two occasions, placing second to Jón Páll Sigmarsson in 1984 and to Jamie Reeves in 1989. He finished 3rd at the World's Strongest Man games in 1986, 4th in 1988, 1st at Europe's Strongest Man in 1987 and was twice Strongest man of the Netherlands. Ab won the IPF World Powerlifting Championships in 1984 in the 125 kg category.

Wolders started competing again at an older age. In 2012 and 2014 he became world champion powerlifting, Masters III.

Wolders competed at 6'0" (183 cm) and approximately 276 lb (125 kg) during his strongman career.

Honours
1st place IPF World Powerlifting Championships 125 kg class (1984)
1st place EPF European Powerlifting Championships 125 kg class (1984)
1st place Strongest man of the Netherlands (1984)
2nd place 1984 World's Strongest Man
1st place Strongest man of the Netherlands (1985)
3rd place 1986 World's Strongest Man
1st place Europe's Strongest Man (1987)
4th place 1988 World's Strongest Man
2nd place 1989 World's Strongest Man
1st place IPF European Powerlifting Championships Master III (705 kg total) -120 kg class (2012)
1st place IPF World Masters III Champion (740,5 total) (world records: squat 280.5 kg and total 740.5 kg (Plzeň) -120 kg (2014)

References

External links
Official website (Dutch)

1951 births
Living people
Dutch strength athletes